Rock Goddess is the debut studio album by the English all-female heavy metal band Rock Goddess. It was originally released in February 1983, on the label A&M. It was produced by experienced sound engineer Vic Maile.

On release, the album was received favourably by the majority of music critics.

The album was re-issued in 2009 on Renaissance in the United States as a digitally remastered CD, featuring two bonus tracks.

Track listing

Personnel
Rock Goddess
Jody Turner – lead vocals; lead and rhythm guitar
Julie Turner – drums; backing vocals
Tracey Lamb – bass guitar; backing vocals

Production
Vic Maile – producer, engineer
Fin Costello – photography

References

External links

Rock Goddess at Metal Maidens.com

Rock Goddess albums
1983 debut albums
Albums produced by Vic Maile
A&M Records albums